The 2003–04 season was Manchester City Football Club's second consecutive season playing in the Premier League, the top division of English football, and its seventh season since the Premier League was first created with Manchester City as one of its original 22 founding member clubs.  Overall, it was the team's 112th season playing in a division of English football, most of which have been spent in the top flight.

Season review 

After finishing ninth during the club's final season at 80-year-old Maine Road, Manchester City's debut season at the City of Manchester Stadium was a major disappointment.  A ninth-place finish had not been good enough to earn City an opportunity to play in the UEFA Cup but the team was rewarded with that opportunity anyway due to being awarded a "Fair Play" slot in the UEFA Cup competition this season. City reached the second round proper of the competition thanks to aggregate victories against The New Saints and Lokeren, but exited the competition on the away goals rule after two draws against Polish club Groclin.

Having embarked on a new era for the club by signing a host of experienced players in the summer, such as Claudio Reyna and Steve McManaman, to combine with such burgeoning talents coming through from the MCFC youth academy as Stephen Ireland and Shaun Wright-Phillips, City started their season very brightly with three wins in five games, sending them near the top of the table. They were still in the top-half of the table after winning five, drawing three and losing three of their first 11 games, with three notably big wins: a 3–0 opening-game away win at Charlton Athletic, a 4–1 home victory over Aston Villa and a 6–2 thumping of Bolton Wanderers. However, a dreadful 3–0 home defeat against unlikely opponents Leicester City in November started a gradual downturn in form and City then ended up battling against relegation. At one point, City went on a run of winning only one game out of 18 league and cup matches played, sparking media rumours of unrest in the squad. Survival in the Premier League was not confirmed until City won their 36th game of the league season. That victory meant that City were six points ahead of the relegation places, but the club's survival was effectively confirmed due to it having a far superior goal difference to Leicester, Leeds and Wolves, who were relegated.

Perhaps the most memorable game played by Manchester City during this season was the FA Cup fourth round replay fixture against Tottenham Hotspur at White Hart Lane which featured what many people consider to be one of the most extraordinary comebacks in the history of the competition. City fell three goals behind during the first half, had Nicolas Anelka substituted due to injury and Joey Barton was sent off during half-time for verbally abusing the referee. Despite having one man less than their opponents during the second half, City came all the way back to win 4–3 and reach the next round. Rookie Icelandic goalkeeper Árni Arason made a key double save and Jon Macken scored the winning goal. In the next round, a Manchester derby at Old Trafford, City lost 4–2 to exit the competition.

Team kit 
There was a change in the producer of the team kits for this season, with Reebok replacing the previous season's supplier, Le Coq Sportif.  The shirt sponsorship was provided by the financial and legal services group First Advice who had also been the sponsors for the previous season.

First-team squad

Left club during season

Historical league performance 
Prior to this season, the history of Manchester City's performance in the English football league hierarchy since the creation of the Premier League in 1992 is summarised by the following timeline chart – which commences with the last season (1991–92) of the old Football League First Division (from which the Premier League was formed).

Friendly games

Pre-season

First game ever played at CoMS

Competitive games

Premier League

Table

Results summary

Points breakdown 

Points at home: 24 
Points away from home: 17 

Points against "Big Four" teams: 4 
Points against promoted teams: 3

6 points: Bolton Wanderers
4 points: Aston Villa, Blackburn Rovers, Charlton Athletic, Everton
3 points: Manchester United, Newcastle United, Southampton
2 points: Fulham, Tottenham Hotspur
1 point: Birmingham City, Leeds United, Leicester City, Liverpool,
Portsmouth, Wolverhampton Wanderers
0 points: Arsenal, Chelsea, Middlesbrough

Biggest & smallest 
Biggest home wins: 6–2 vs. Bolton Wanderers, 18 October 2003 
5–1 vs. Everton, 15 May 2004 
Biggest home defeat: 0–3 vs. Leicester City, 9 November 2003 
Biggest away win: 0–3 vs. Charlton Athletic, 17 August 2003 
Biggest away defeat: 3–0 vs. Newcastle United, 22 November 2003 

Biggest home attendance: 47,304 vs. Chelsea, 28 February 2004 
Smallest home attendance: 44,307 vs. Charlton Athletic, 7 January 2004 
Biggest away attendance: 67,645 vs. Manchester United, 13 December 2003 
Smallest away attendance: 16,124 vs. Fulham, 20 September 2003

Results by round

Individual match reports

UEFA Cup 

Final aggregate score 1–1 with Groclin progressing on away goals rule

League Cup

FA Cup

Statistics

Appearances and goals

|-
! colspan=14 style=background:#dcdcdc; text-align:center| Goalkeepers

|-
! colspan=14 style=background:#dcdcdc; text-align:center| Defenders

|-
! colspan=14 style=background:#dcdcdc; text-align:center| Midfielders

|-
! colspan=14 style=background:#dcdcdc; text-align:center| Forwards

|-
! colspan=14 style=background:#dcdcdc; text-align:center| Players transferred out during the season

|}

Starting 11

Goal scorers

All competitions

Premier League

UEFA Cup

League Cup and FA Cup 

Information current as of 15 May 2004 (end of season)

Transfers and loans

Transfers in

Transfers out

Loans in

Loans out

References 

Manchester City F.C. seasons
Manchester City
Articles which contain graphical timelines